Dacheng may refer to:

Dacheng quan (大成拳), or Yiquan, a Chinese martial art
Mahayana Buddhism, called 大乘 (Dàchéng or Dàshèng) in Chinese

Mainland China
Dacheng County (大城县), Hebei
Dacheng Law Offices (大成律师事务所), an international law firm headquartered in Beijing
Dacheng Subdistrict, Tianshui (大城街道), in Qinzhou District, Tianshui, Gansu
Dacheng Subdistrict, Harbin (大成街道), in Nangang District, Harbin, Heilongjiang
Towns
Dacheng, Jiangxi (大城镇), town in Gao'an
Written as "大成镇":
Dacheng, Maoming, in Xinyi, Guangdong
Dacheng, Guangxi, in Pubei County
Dacheng, Hainan, in Danzhou
Dacheng, Sichuan, in Xuanhan County

Taiwan
Dacheng, Changhua (大城鄉), township in Changhua County, Taiwan